La Colombe Coffee Roasters (originally La Colombe Torrefaction) is a US coffee roaster and retailer headquartered in Philadelphia. The company currently has cafés in Philadelphia, New York, Washington D.C, and elsewhere. La Colombe is representative of roasters that originated in the third wave of coffee, and was one of the early pioneers of direct trade coffee sourcing.

History
La Colombe was founded by Todd Carmichael and JP Iberti in 1994, with its first location near Rittenhouse Square in Philadelphia. In 2015, Hamdi Ulukaya (founder of Chobani) purchased a share of the company. Ulukaya bought out private equity firm Goode Partners to gain his stake, and helped the company raise $28.5 million to help fund plans for expansion.

La Colombe was one of several small-scale coffee roasters that either received large investments or were acquired outright in 2015. The company continues to expand with cafes in cities with existing locations, such as Washington, D.C., as well as in new cities, including Chicago, Boston, Pittsburgh, and San Diego. As of 2019, La Colombe owns and operates 30 cafes, all in the US.

Products and collaborations

Products
In 2016, the company began offering a canned version of the Draft Latte, a cold-pressed espresso and frothed milk latte first offered on tap in their cafes. The beverages are available for purchase at select retailers throughout the United States, as well as at all La Colombe cafes. Draft Lattes are produced at La Colombe's manufacturing facility in Norton Shores, Michigan.  The cans for the latte were designed by La Colombe CEO Todd Carmichael, and produced by Philadelphia-based Crown Holdings. A unique plastic cover that resembles a go-to-cup adorns the lid. The Draft Latte is produced in multiple flavors.

Other products include Different Drum, a coffee-infused rum, produced at a micro-distillery located in its Fishtown, Philadelphia cafe, and a line of La Colombe single-origin and blended roasted coffees, which are available for purchase in retail stores or via the company's website.
The company also produces a line of ready-to-drink Cold Brew available at grocery stores in larger bottles, as well as cold brew concentrate.

Haiti Coffee Academy
In 2013, La Colombe worked with the Clinton Foundation to found the Haiti Coffee Academy. The organization aims to improve coffee growers’ livelihoods in Haiti through training programs for smallholder farmers, a demonstration farm and nursery, and efforts to strengthen the supply chain for both local and export markets for Haitian coffee.

Other collaborations
La Colombe collaborated with Yards Brewing Company, another Philadelphia-area company, in 2016 to produce a coffee stout to be served in local Shake Shack branches.

The company collaborated in 2016 with the Icelandic brewer Einstök and again with Yards on Snorri's Awakening, a coffee pale ale.

See also 

 List of coffeehouse chains
 List of coffee companies

References

Smart coffee

Companies based in Philadelphia
Coffeehouses and cafés in the United States
Coffee brands
American companies established in 1994
Food and drink companies established in 1994
Retail companies established in 1994
1994 establishments in Pennsylvania